Anne Griffin  is a camogie player and a member of the Dublin  junior squad that won the All-Ireland in 2005 and 2006. She is a member of Ballyboden St Endas winning senior championships in 2006 and 2008 as well as a Leinster club title in 2008. An insurance representative, Anne was nominated for a Gala Performance award in 2009.

References

External links
 Official Camogie Website
 Dublin Camogie website
 Review of 2009 championship in On The Ball Official Camogie Magazine
 https://web.archive.org/web/20091228032101/http://www.rte.ie/sport/gaa/championship/gaa_fixtures_camogie_oduffycup.html Fixtures and results] for the 2009 O'Duffy Cup
 All-Ireland Senior Camogie Championship: Roll of Honour
 Video highlights of 2009 championship Part One and part two
 Video of Dublin’s 2009 championship match against Tipperary
 Video of 2009 Dublin senior semi-final Good Counsel 1-07 Ballyboden 0-8
 Video of 2009 Dublin senior semi-final Naomh Mearnog 3-7 St Vincent’s 0-13

Year of birth missing (living people)
Living people
Dublin camogie players